Diana Caroline Garnett (Japanese: ダイアナ・キャロライン・ガーネット, Hepburn: Daiana Kyarorain Gānetto), better known by her stage name Diana Garnet is an American J-pop singer from Washington D.C., signed to Mastersix Foundation under Sony Music Entertainment Japan.

Biography 
Born in Washington, D.C., Diana was influenced by her father, a fan of anime and manga, and grew up interested in Japanese culture. In particular, she was greatly impressed, and influenced by Japanese music used in anime, which motivated her to pursue a singing career in Japan.

Her interest in the country was further sparked by two-year-long exchanges in Japan in both High School and university. Upon graduating from university, she relocated to Tokyo, Japan to work as an Assistant Language Teacher while doing freelance narration and vocals for radio and advertisements.

She began uploading covers of anime, J-pop and vocaloid songs onto YouTube and Niconico, gaining popularity and attention under her aliases Tonkhai and トンカイ.

2013–2014: Nodojiman The World, Japanese Debut and Cover☆Girl 
This eventually led to an appearance on NTV's singing competition 'Nodojiman The World', where she won the Spring 2013 edition.

Following her victory, she signed with Sony Music Artists, and made her major debut on October 22, 2013, with her first single Mata Kimi ni Koishiteru, containing three cover songs: the title track, originally by Billy BanBan, along two others, "My Revolution", originally by Misato Watanabe, and "Endless Story", originally by Yuna Ito, under Mastersix Foundation and Sony Music Records.

She held three release events at the Lazona Kawasaki Plaza, the Aeon Mall Kisogawa and Abeno Cues Town to commemorate the single, and promoted her release by appearing on music shows as Nippon TV's Music Dragon ~Ongaku Ryū~ and tvk's Mirai Teiban Kyoku ~Future Standard~, as well as radio shows like MBS Radio's MBS Utagumi Smile×Songs and FM NACK5's The Nutty Radio Show: Onitama, conversing solely in the Japanese language.

A cover album named Cover☆Girl, compiling the tracks Mata Kimi ni Koishiteru and My Revolution from her first single among other covers of songs like Judy and Mary's Sobakasu, Zone's Secret base ~Kimi ga kureta mono~ and Yoko Takahashi's Zankoku Tenshi na These was released on November 27.

The songstress held a series of release events nationwide from November 27 to January 13, 2014. She promoted her album by appearing on music shows like TBS' 'Count Down TV' and TV Tokyo's  Premia MelodiX!, variety shows like Nippon TV's 'PON!' and Monomane Grand Prix: The Tournament 2013 and on many radio shows like FM Okayama's 'Fresh Morning OKAYAMA' or CBC Radio's Wakasa Keiichi no Spo-On.

2014–2015: Featured artist, Spinning World and Nankai! Mystery 
2014 saw Diana being featured as an artist in Dohzi-T's track Turn Me On ft. Diana Garnet, released on March 19 on his sixth studio album T's Music.

The title track of her overall second and first original single, "Spinning World", released on February 11, 2015, was used as the ending theme song for the anime Naruto: Shippuden, and grew to one of the most beloved songs to her fans, garnering it an additional, well-received lossless version for music downloads.

She promoted her first theme song feature with release events in the Tower Records' chain store in Hiroshima and Onoda SunPark in Sanyo-Onoda. She also appeared on TV shows like TV Tokyo's 'Animemashite' and variety shows like TV Asahi's Kanjani8 no The Mozart: Ongaku-ou No.1 Ketteisen.

On February 25, Japanese rock band Flow released their compilation album Flow Anime Best Kiwami, featuring her on their cover track Blue Bird ft. Diana Garnet, originally by Japanese pop-rock band Ikimono-gakari. She, as well as Granrodeo, guest performed with the band on their Flow World Tour 2015 極 -kiwami- world tour finale in the Hibiya Open-Air Concert Hall in Chiyoda, Tokyo.

Her overall third and second original single, Nankai! Mystery, was released on November 25. Its title track was chosen to be the theme song to the anime Tantei Team KZ, an adaptation of the original light novel series. The singer promoted her single by appearing on several variety shows like Fuji TV's Monomane Ouza Ketteisen.

2017–2018: Voice actor, Igo Focus, Radio host and Thank you for the Music 
In 2017, Diana branched out in her engagements, appearing in many events in Japan, like the KIDSTONE Summer Presentation Program, and stateside, like Ohayocon and Animazement, as well as on TV and in print, also taking on voice acting and narration and becoming a TV host.

In February, she first provided her voice for English-speaking role of Joule/Lumen, the heroine of Azure Striker Gunvolt, in the English dub of the original video anime adaptation of the game, released worldwide on the Nintendo eShop.

In 2017, she provided the voice for the English Dub Live Action Anime film Shimajiro and the Rainbow Oasis. And later on in 2018, provided the voice in the English Dub Anime Shimajiro the Movie: Adventures on Magic Island 

From April until March 2018, she was the host for the 2017 season of the long-running series Igo Focus, an establishment in the Japanese world of Go, exploring strategies used in the game and introducing other professional players, such as co-hosts Ryugo Koyama, who co-hosted from April to September, and Kazushige Ando, who co-hosted from October to March 2018.

During the same time she also narrated the NHK World series Anime Supernova, highlighting different directors in the Japanese animation industry. She also landed her first Japanese-speaking role for the dramatization of Yushi Okajima's book '', bringing the human form of Database Management System to life.

Later in the year, she provided her voice for English-speaking roles for several games, like Super Bomberman R.

2019–: Game OSTs, California tour and Hello Again

Discography

Studio albums

Singles

Digital singles

Features

As Diana Garnett

As Diana Garnet

As Tonkhai

References

External links 
 

Living people
American expatriates in Japan
J-pop singers
Japanese-language singers
21st-century American singers
21st-century American women singers
Singers from Washington, D.C.
Year of birth missing (living people)